Arthur Allan Sharp (9 July 1905 – 1991) was an English footballer who played as an inside forward in the Football League for Carlisle United, Bristol City, Aldershot, Oldham Athletic and Darlington. He was also on the books of Blackpool, Reading and West Ham United without representing them in the League, and played non-league football for Nottingham St Mark's, Loughborough Corinthians, Mansfield Town, Newark Town, Shrewsbury Town and Scarborough.

References

1905 births
1991 deaths
Footballers from Nottingham
English footballers
Association football inside forwards
Loughborough Corinthians F.C. players
Mansfield Town F.C. players
Blackpool F.C. players
Reading F.C. players
West Ham United F.C. players
Newark Town F.C. players
Carlisle United F.C. players
Bristol City F.C. players
Aldershot F.C. players
Oldham Athletic A.F.C. players
Shrewsbury Town F.C. players
Darlington F.C. players
Scarborough F.C. players
English Football League players
Date of death missing
Place of death missing